is a Japanese film director.

Career
Born in Nagano Prefecture, Yamaguchi graduated from Waseda University and began working at the Tōei studios in Kyoto. He directed a number of action movie series in the 1970s and has also helmed many TV movies.

Filmography
 Delinquent Girl Boss: Blossoming Night Dreams (1970)
 Wandering Ginza Butterfly (1972)
 Gincho Nagaremono: Mesuneko Bakuchi (1972) 
 Sister Street Fighter (1974)
 Sister Street Fighter: Hanging by a Thread (1974)
 A Haunted Turkish Bathhouse (1975)
 The Return of the Sister Street Fighter (1975)
 Champion of Death (1975)
 Karate Bearfighter (1975)
  (1975)
 G-Men '75 (1975-82) television series
 Circuit no Ōkami (1977)
 Karate for Life (1977)
 School Wars: Hero (1984) television series

References

Living people
Japanese film directors
Waseda University alumni
People from Nagano Prefecture
1937 births
People from Kyoto